Martyn Jones (born 1955) is a British contemporary painter who works from his studio in Cardiff, Wales.

Biography
Jones, who was born in Aberaman, near Aberdare in Rhondda Cynon Taf, graduated with an M.A. in Fine Art from Chelsea School of Art, London and was awarded Junior Fellowship at Bath Academy of Art. Among his tutors were the British artists Adrian Heath and Patrick Heron. His work is represented in the UK by the Ffin-y-Parc Gallery and Kooywood Gallery, Wales and the No. 9 Gallery in Birmingham, and in USA by Artefact Pardo Gallery, Miami and the Robert Steele Gallery, New York.

Jones was publicity officer for the 56 Group Wales from 1996 to 2000.

During 2008 Jones staged his first major international solo exhibition "Overland" at the Robert Steele Gallery, Chelsea, Manhattan, comprising over forty works. The Robert Steele Gallery has represented Jones' work, since 2004, in a variety of international and themed group exhibitions. In March 2010 Jones exhibited his second solo-show at the Robert Steele Gallery,

During 2012 Jones exhibited in three solo-shows, at Artefact Pardo Gallery in Palm Beach County, Florida, at the Oriel Ynys Mon Gallery in Anglesey and at the Kooywood Gallery in Cardiff.

Jones' work has been exhibited widely in UK, Europe and USA, including at the National Museums and Galleries of Wales, at the Wales International Centre and the Chrysler Building in New York City.

Artwork
His work is represented in numerous public and private collections in Europe and the US He is represented by the Kooywood Gallery, Cardiff and by the Robert Steele Gallery, New York City.

Jones describes his own work as:

Exhibitions
Selected solo exhibitions

2018 Heath Gallery, Palm Springs, California
2017 Ffin-y-Parc Gallery, Wales
2015 Ffin-y-Parc Gallery, Wales
2015 Artefact Pardo Gallery, Florida
2014 Kooywood Gallery, Cardiff, Wales
2013 Ffin-y-Parc Gallery, Wales
2012 Artefact Pardo Gallery, West Palm Beach, Florida
2012 Oriel Ynys Mon, Anglesey, North Wales
2012 Kooywood Gallery, Cardiff, Wales
2011 Off the Wall Gallery, Cardiff, Wales
2010 Atelier, Robert Steele Gallery, New York
2010 Off the Wall Contemporary Art, Cardiff, Wales
2009 Kooywood Gallery, Cardiff
2008 Overland, Robert Steele Gallery, New York

Selected group exhibitions
2011 'Jones/Melero' Espacio 1440 Biscayne Blvd., Miami
2011 'ArtAt' Arts Festival, Pembrokeshire, Wales
2011 'Etcetera – 4 Contemporary Painters', Oxmarket Centre of Arts, Chichester, West Sussex, England
2010 Blackheath Gallery, London, England
2010 Cowbridge Gallery, Wales
2009 Summer in Suite 402, Robert Steele Gallery, New York City
2009 Robert Steele Gallery, New York City
2009 National Eisteddfod, Bala, Wales
2009 International Artexpo, Jacob Javits Center, New York City
2008 Ffres Ysbryd/Spirit Wales Newport Museum and Gallery, Wales
2008 International Artists Summer Show, Robert Steele Gallery, New York City
2008 56 Group Wales, Tenby Museum, Oriel Myrddin, Wales
2007 Chelsea Summer Dreaming, Robert Steele Gallery, New York City
2007 Kooywood Gallery, Cardiff, Wales
2007 West Wales Arts Centre, Fishguard, Wales
2007 Attic Gallery, Swansea, Wales
2006 on the Horizon, Robert Steele Gallery, New York City

Collections
 Ashby Media, New York City.
 Harlem Homes, New York.
 Feederle-Schlaffer, Zurich, Switzerland.
 Allied Irish Banks, Wales.
 Cynon Valley Museum and Gallery, Wales.
 University of Dallas, Texas.
 University of Glamorgan, Wales.
 Contemporary Art Society, London.
 Wales International Center, New York.
 Mosaic Information Solutions Ltd., Aberdeen, Scotland.

References

Notes

Other sources
 2009 Western Mail When Colour is the Key Karen Price.
 2008 New York Art World magazine, Art Review'. 2008 Celtic Newspapers Artist who's a draw in States Kathryn Williams.
 2007 Western Mail, Favourite Room, Leah Bryant.
 2006 Western Mail, Visual Arts, Studio Interview, Karen Price.
 2005 ITV Wales News, Artist Studio Interview.
 2005 Western Mail, New York Gets a Taste of Welsh Abstract, Emily Lambert.
 2002 Western Mail, Artists Rise to a Challenge, Mel Gooding.
 2002 A Propos, National Museums and Galleries of Wales, Michael Tooby.
 2002 Western Mail Bay Building with a New York Feel, Karen Price.
 2001 Hello Magazine Diary of the Week.
 2001 Feed the Beast, BBC TV
 2000 On Painting for Ysbryd/Spirit Wales, Norbet Lynton.

External links
 www.martynjonesart.com – Jones' website
 Robert Steele Gallery
 Kooywood Gallery
 
 Welsh Icons – Artist

Living people
20th-century Welsh painters
20th-century British male artists
21st-century Welsh painters
21st-century Welsh male artists
21st-century male artists
1955 births
Members of the 56 Group Wales
People from Aberdare
Welsh male painters
20th-century Welsh male artists